New Hyde Park is a Long Island Rail Road station on the Main Line. It is located at New Hyde Park Road and Second Avenue in New Hyde Park, New York. The station house was near the eastern part of the westbound platform, it is now demolished for the accommodation of the LIRR's third track expansion project. The station is wheelchair accessible and had two grade crossings on either side of the station; however, as of 2020, both have been demolished and turned into an underpasses. It is only listed on the Port Jefferson Branch timetable and most service is provided by that branch.

History

Early history 
The Long Island Rail Road was built through the area in 1837, although no station was built until 1845. It was originally named "Hyde Park" station, and was rebuilt in 1870. Despite Hyde Park changing its name to "New Hyde Park" in March 1871 in order to avoid confusion with another Hyde Park in Dutchess County, the LIRR kept the original name of the station until September 1904. The 1870-built station was located along the eastbound tracks with an open wooden shelter shed along the westbound tracks. This station contained elaborate gingerbread woodwork, similar to that of Yaphank station during the same period.

Station renovations 
In 1947, the station house was rebuilt again with a smaller and less elaborate brick structure, and relocated along the westbound tracks, with a matching brick open shelter along the eastbound tracks. Sometime during the 1960s, high-level platforms were added to the station, with a white stucco wall between the platforms and station house containing a blue sign with white lettering reading "LONG ISLAND RAIL ROAD" on top and "NEW HYDE PARK VILLAGE" on the bottom. This was replaced between 2002 and 2003 with the retro-classic structure seen today.

In October 1979, work began on a $525,000 project to extend the platforms at the station to accommodate ten-car trains. At the time, the westbound platform was eight cars long, while the eastbound platform was four cars long. The work, which also required some renovations to the station building, was expected to be completed in four months.

As part of the Main Line third track project, the New Hyde Park station will be upgraded, and Platform B will be relocated. The two platforms will be demolished and replaced by -wide platforms that can handle 12-car trains.  Canopies, benches, signage, and security cameras will be installed. The new platforms will be heated to facilitate snow removal. The station will be made compliant with the Americans with Disabilities Act of 1990 via the installation of two ramps to each platform. Four new staircases will also be provided to the westbound platform and five new staircases will provide additional access to the eastbound platform, and either an overpass or an underpass would be built at the station. Amenities such as Wi-Fi, USB charging stations, artwork, and digital information displays would be included in the renovation. The electrical substation at New Hyde Park station will be replaced to make way for the third track.

Additionally, the grade crossing at New Hyde Park Road was eliminated and replaced with a vehicular underpass. The road was closed on February 3, 2020 and the crossing was eliminated in summer 2020; the underpass opened to traffic on August 24, 2020. A new park-and-ride facility was built between Plaza and Second Avenues. On October 24, 2020 the 12th Street grade crossing at the west end of the station was closed permanently to traffic, and in early 2021 was replaced with a pedestrian underpass.

Platforms and tracks
This station has two high-level side platforms, each 12 cars long. At the height of rush hour, especially during the morning rush, both tracks are used in the peak direction. The westbound platform has the only station house and parking lot. Each platform has a staircase at South 12th Street on the western end and New Hyde Park Road on the eastern end. An ADA-accessible pedestrian underpass is located where the 12th Street grade crossing used to exist.

Image gallery

References

External links 

 Station House from Google Maps Street View (Exterior)
Platforms from Google Maps Street View
Station House from Google Maps Street View (Interior)

Long Island Rail Road stations in Nassau County, New York
Railway stations in the United States opened in 1845